William Robert Weiley (6  April 1901 – 11 September 1989) was an Australian politician and a member of the New South Wales Legislative Assembly  from 1955 until 1971. He was a member of the Country Party.

Weiley was born in  Grafton, New South Wales and was educated at Grafton High School. He was employed as a commercial traveler, radio announcer and hotel manager. Weiley became involved in community organizations in Grafton including the Hospital Board, Chamber of Commerce, Rotary International and the Grafton Water Board. He was elected as an alderman on Grafton City Council between 1937 and 1953 and was the Mayor from 1950–1952. Weiley was elected  to parliament as the Country Party  member for Clarence at the 1955 by-election caused by the death of the incumbent  member Cecil Wingfield.  He was re-elected at the next 5 elections and retired in 1971.

References

 

1901 births
1989 deaths
National Party of Australia members of the Parliament of New South Wales
Members of the New South Wales Legislative Assembly
20th-century Australian politicians